Leandro Rovirosa Wade (26 February 1918 – 6 April 2014) was a Mexican politician affiliated with the Institutional Revolutionary Party (PRI) who served as Governor of Tabasco during the 1977–82 period. He previously served as Secretary of Water Resources during the government of Luis Echeverría.

References

1918 births
2014 deaths
People from Villahermosa
Governors of Tabasco
Institutional Revolutionary Party politicians
Politicians from Tabasco
20th-century Mexican politicians